Deh-e Shur (also Romanized as Deh-e Shūr Ākhūnd; also known as Deh-e Shūr, Deh Shīr, and Deh Shūr) is a village in Javar Rural District, in the Central District of Kuhbanan County, Kerman Province, Iran. At the 2006 census, its population was 25, in 9 families.

References 

Populated places in Kuhbanan County